The following outline is provided as an overview of and topical guide to Prince Edward Island:

Prince Edward Island – Canadian province consisting of an island of the same name, as well as other islands. It is one of the three Maritime provinces and is the smallest in the nation in land area and in population.  According to the 2011 census, the province of Prince Edward Island has 140,204 residents. It is located approximately 200 km north of Halifax, Nova Scotia and 600 km east of Quebec City. It consists of the main island plus 231 minor islands.

General reference 
 Pronunciation: 
 Common English country name(s): Prince Edward Island
 Official English country name(s): Province of Prince Edward Island
 Nickname(s):
 "Garden of the Gulf"
 "Birthplace of Confederation"
 Common endonym(s):  
 Official endonym(s):  
 Adjectival(s): 
 Demonym(s):

Geography of Prince Edward Island 

Geography of Prince Edward Island
 Prince Edward Island is: an island province of Canada
 Population of Prince Edward Island: 
 Area of Prince Edward Island:  
 Atlas of Prince Edward Island

Location 
 Prince Edward Island is situated within the following regions:
 Northern Hemisphere, Western Hemisphere
 Americas
 North America
 Northern America
 Laurentia
 Canada
 Eastern Canada
 Atlantic Canada
 The Maritimes
 Atlantic Ocean
 Gulf of St. Lawrence
 Time zone(s): Atlantic

Environment of Prince Edward Island 
 List of protected areas of Prince Edward Island
 List of historic places in Prince Edward Island
 List of National Historic Sites of Canada in Prince Edward Island

Natural geographic features of Prince Edward Island 
 Islands of Prince Edward Island
 Rivers of Prince Edward Island
 World Heritage Sites in Prince Edward Island

Islands of Prince Edward Island 
 List of islands of Prince Edward Island

Administrative divisions of Prince Edward Island 

 Counties of Prince Edward Island
 Parishes in Prince Edward Island

Counties of Prince Edward Island 

Counties of Prince Edward Island
Kings County, Prince Edward Island
 Shiretown: Georgetown
Prince County, Prince Edward Island
 Shiretown: Summerside
Queens County, Prince Edward Island
 Shiretown: Charlottetown

Parishes of Prince Edward Island, by county 

 Prince County
North Parish
Egmont Parish
Halifax Parish
Richmond Parish
St. David's Parish
 Queens County
Grenville Parish
Hillsboro Parish
Charlotte Parish
Bedford Parish
St. John's Parish
 Kings County
St. Mary's Parish
St. Patrick's Parish
East Parish
St. George's Parish
St. Andrew's Parish

Municipalities of Prince Edward Island 

 Capital of Prince Edward Island: Capital of Prince Edward Island
 List of population centres in Prince Edward Island
 Cities of Prince Edward Island
 List of townships in Prince Edward Island

Demography of Prince Edward Island 

Demographics of Prince Edward Island
 List of population centres in Prince Edward Island

Government and politics of Prince Edward Island 

Politics of Prince Edward Island

 Form of government: Constitutional monarchy
 Capital of Prince Edward Island: Charlottetown
 Elections in Prince Edward Island
 Elections Prince Edward Island
 Canadian federal election results in Prince Edward Island
 Prince Edward Island general elections
 1873 - 1876 - 1879 - 1882 - 1886 - 1890 - 1893 - 1897 - 1900 - 1904 - 1908 - 1912 - 1915 - 1919 - 1923 - 1927 - 1931 - 1935 - 1939 - 1943 - 1947 - 1951 - 1955 - 1959 - 1962 - 1966 - 1970 - 1974 - 1978 - 1979 - 1982 - 1986 - 1989 - 1993 - 1996 - 2000 - 2003 - 2007- 2011 - 2015
 First Nations in Prince Edward Island – First Nations are the various Aboriginal peoples in Canada who are neither Inuit nor Métis.
 Indian Association of Prince Edward Island – province-wide First Nations rights organization.
 Political parties in Prince Edward Island
 Taxation in Prince Edward Island

Federal representation 
 Senators

Provincial government of Prince Edward Island

Executive branch

 Head of state: King in Right of Prince Edward Island, King of Canada, King Charles III
 Head of state's representative (Viceroy): Lieutenant Governor of Prince Edward Island
 List of lieutenant governors of Prince Edward Island
 Head of government: Premier of Prince Edward Island
 List of premiers of Prince Edward Island
 Deputy Premier of Prince Edward Island
 Cabinet: Executive Council of Prince Edward Island
 Head of council: Lieutenant Governor in Council, as representative of the King in Right of Prince Edward Island
 Order of precedence in Prince Edward Island
 Prince Edward Island ministries

Legislative branch

 Parliament of Prince Edward Island, which has 2 components:
 King-in-Parliament (King of Canada), represented in his absence by the Lieutenant-Governor of Prince Edward Island
 List of lieutenant governors of Prince Edward Island
 Legislative Assembly of Prince Edward Island
 Speaker of the Legislative Assembly of Prince Edward Island
 List of Prince Edward Island General Assemblies
 Leader of the Opposition (Prince Edward Island)
 Federal representation
 List of Prince Edward Island senators

Judicial branch

 Supreme Court of Prince Edward Island
 Court of Appeal of Prince Edward Island
 Court of King's Bench of Prince Edward Island (Superior court)
 Provincial Court of Prince Edward Island
 County Court of Prince Edward Island

Foreign relations of Prince Edward Island 

Foreign relations of Prince Edward Island
 Diplomatic missions in Prince Edward Island
 Diplomatic missions of Prince Edward Island

Law and order in Prince Edward Island 
 Same-sex marriage in Prince Edward Island

Military of Prince Edward Island

Local government in Prince Edward Island

History of Prince Edward Island 

History of Prince Edward Island

History of Prince Edward Island, by period

History of Prince Edward Island, by region

History of Prince Edward Island, by subject

Culture of Prince Edward Island 

Culture of Prince Edward Island
 Architecture in Prince Edward Island
 List of lighthouses in Prince Edward Island
 Museums in Prince Edward Island
 Order of Prince Edward Island
 Scouting and Guiding in Prince Edward Island
 Symbols of Prince Edward Island
 Coat of arms of Prince Edward Island
 Flag of Prince Edward Island
 World Heritage Sites in Prince Edward Island

Art in Prince Edward Island 
 Prince Edward Island Council of the Arts
 Music of Prince Edward Island
 Prince Edward Island Music Awards

Sports in Prince Edward Island 
 List of curling clubs in Prince Edward Island
 Hockey in Prince Edward Island
 List of ice hockey teams in Prince Edward Island
 Prince Edward Island Junior C Hockey League
 Prince Edward Island Rugby Union
 Prince Edward Island Scotties Tournament of Hearts

Economy of Prince Edward Island 

Economy of Prince Edward Island
 Communications in Prince Edward Island
 List of radio stations in Prince Edward Island
 List of television stations in Prince Edward Island
 Postage stamps and postal history of Prince Edward Island
 Energy in Prince Edward Island
 List of electrical generating stations in Prince Edward Island
 Petroleum pricing in Prince Edward Island
 Health in Prince Edward Island
 Prince Edward Island Hospital
 Transport in Prince Edward Island
 Airports in Prince Edward Island
 Roads in Prince Edward Island
 List of Prince Edward Island provincial highways
 Vehicle registration plates of Prince Edward Island

Education in Prince Edward Island 
 English Language School Board (Prince Edward Island)
 List of school districts in Prince Edward Island
 Higher education in Prince Edward Island
 University of Prince Edward Island

See also 

 Outline of geography
 Outline of North America
 Outline of Canada
 Outline of Alberta
 Outline of British Columbia
 Outline of Manitoba
 Outline of Nova Scotia
 Outline of Ontario
 Outline of Quebec
 Outline of Saskatchewan

References

External links 

Prince Edward Island
Prince Edward Island
 1